The Eastern Hockey League was a minor professional United States ice hockey league.

Eastern Amateur Hockey League (1933–1953)
The league was founded in 1933 as the Eastern Amateur Hockey League (EAHL). The league was founded by Tommy Lockhart, who served as its commissioner from 1937 to 1972. Lockhart, who operated a small intramural hockey league at New York City's Madison Square Garden, offered his teams – and the use of the MSG ice – in exchange for joining the league.

The EAHL operated between 1933–1948 and 1949–1953. The league had a somewhat tenuous existence. It began with seven teams, and had various numbers of teams, going as low as four. There was no 1948–49 season, but the league returned for the 1949–50 season with eight teams. The league again did not operate during the 1953–54 season.

Teams
 Atlantic City Seagulls (1933–34 to 1941–42; 1947–48 to 1951–52)
 Baltimore Blades/Baltimore Clippers (1944–45 to 1949–50)
 Baltimore Orioles (1933–34 to 1941–42)
 Boston Olympics (1940–41 to 1951–52)
 Bronx Tigers (1933–34 to 1933–34; 1937–38)
 Cleveland Knights (1949–50)
 Grand Rapids Rockets (1949–50)
 Hershey B'ars/Hershey Bears (1933–34 to 1937–38)
 Hershey Cubs (1938–39)
 Johnstown Bluebirds (1941–42)
 Johnstown Jets (1950–51 to 1952–53)
 Milwaukee Clarks (1949–50)
 New Haven Crescents/Brooklyn Crescents (1943–44)
 New Haven Nutmegs (1952–53)
 New Haven Tomahawks (1951–52)
 New York Athletic Club (1933–34)
 New York-Hamilton Crescents (1933–34 to 1934–35)
 New York Rovers (1935–36 to 1951–52)
 Philadelphia Falcons (1942–43 to 1945–46; 1951–52)
 Pittsburgh Yellow Jackets (1935–36 to 1936–37)
 Rivervale Skeeters (1939–40 to 1941–42)
 St. Nicholas Hockey Club (1933–34)
 Springfield Indians (1951–52 to 1952–53)
 Toledo Buckeyes (1949–50)
 Troy Uncle Sam Trojans (1952–53)
 United States Coast Guard Cutters (1942–43)
 Washington Eagles (1939–40 to 1941–42)
 Washington Lions (1944–45 to 1946–47; 1951–52 to 1952–53)

Eastern Hockey League (1954–1973)

The league started back up for the 1954–55 season and changed its name to the Eastern Hockey League.

The league operated between 1954 and 1973. It began with five teams and grew into two divisions for the 1959–60 season. The league reached it peak in terms of team number in the 1967–68 when it had twelve teams in two divisions. In its final season the league had twelve teams split into three divisions.

The EHL ceased operations after the 1972–73 season.  Some of its northern teams became the North American Hockey League, while most of its Southern teams became the Southern Hockey League.

Teams
 Baltimore Clippers (1954–55 to 1955–56)
 Cape Cod Cubs (1972–73)
 Charlotte Checkers (1956–57 to 1972–73)
 Clinton Comets (1954–55 to 1972–73)
 Greensboro Generals (1959–60 to 1972–73)
 Jacksonville Rockets/Florida Rockets (1964–65 to 1971–72)
 Jersey Devils (1964–65 to 1972–73)
 Jersey Larks (1960–61)
 Johnstown Jets (1955–56 to 1972–73)
 Knoxville Knights (1961–62 to 1967–68)
 Long Island Ducks (1961–62 to 1972–73)
 Nashville Dixie Flyers (1962–63 to 1970–71)
 New Haven Blades (1954–55 to 1971–72) & New England Blades (1972–73)
 New York Rovers (1959–60 to 1960–61; 1964–65)
 Philadelphia Ramblers (1955–56 to 1963–64)
 Rhode Island Eagles (1972–73)
 Salem Rebels (1967–68 to 1969–70) and Roanoke Valley Rebels (1970–71 to 1972–73)
 St. Petersburg Suns (1971–72) and Suncoast Suns (1972–73)
 Syracuse Blazers (1967–68 to 1972–73)
 Washington Lions (1954–55 to 1956–57)
 Washington Presidents (1957–58 to 1959–60)
 Worcester Warriors (1954–55)

References

External links
 Eastern Hockey League, HockeyDB
 http://www.theEHL.com

 
EHL